is a Japanese footballer who plays as a defender for Vissel Kobe.

Career
Honda made his official debut for Nagoya Grampus in the J1 League on 16 March 2013 against Ventforet Kofu in which he scored the winning goal for Grampus 4 minutes into stoppage time in the 2nd half to win the game for Grampus 1–0.

In December 2015, Honda signed for Kyoto Sanga.

Career statistics

Club
Updated to end of 2018 season.

References

External links 
 Profile at Kyoto Sanga

 

1991 births
Living people
Hannan University alumni
Association football people from Aichi Prefecture
Japanese footballers
J1 League players
J2 League players
Nagoya Grampus players
Kyoto Sanga FC players
Vissel Kobe players
Association football defenders